Caivano is a city and comune (municipality) in the Metropolitan City of Naples in the Italian region Campania, located about 14 km northeast of Naples.

The municipality contains the frazioni Casolla Valenzano and Pascarola. Pascarola is home to a large industrial area. There are remains of an ancient Roman theater in Casolla.

Caivano was the first capital of Old Atella; it was replaced by Frattamaggiore.

Caivano has been heavily damaged by the waste traffic of the Camorra. It's one of the main spots of the Land of the Fires. The town's outskirts are one of the most contaminated areas in Europe.

People
Francesco Morano

References

External links
 Official website

Cities and towns in Campania